Ayissoudou Jeannot Bouyain (born 29 May 1985, in Ouagadougou) is a Burkinabé former professional footballer who played as a midfielder.

International career
Bouyain represented Burkina Faso at the 2001 FIFA U-17 World Championship in Trinidad and Tobago and played two years later the 2003 FIFA World Youth Championship in the United Arab Emirates. He was part of the Burkina Faso national team which finished in fourth place in the 2006 FIFA World Cup qualification (CAF).

References

1985 births
Living people
Sportspeople from Ouagadougou
Burkinabé footballers
Burkina Faso international footballers
Association football forwards
ASFA Yennenga players
Planète Champion players
Rail Club du Kadiogo players
Blois Football 41 players
Olympique Saumur FC players
SO Cholet players
Burkinabé expatriate footballers
Expatriate footballers in France
Burkinabé expatriate sportspeople in France
21st-century Burkinabé people